William Tredway (1833–1909) was a businessman turned politician in Woburn, Scarborough, Ontario, Canada.

Business Involvement
At the age of 22, Tredway opened a general store at Eglinton and Kingston Roads which he sold circa 1865 and moved to the store located at Old Kingston Road and Morrish Road in Highland Creek.  His business in this store was so prosperous that he sold it in 1878 to pursue his primary interest, politics.

Political Involvement
Tredway was elected as councillor for ward 1874-5-6-7-8 and was Deputy Reeve for the last two of those terms.  In his next and final political venture, he ran for Reeve of the Township but lost considering that most of the votes were in the western part of the Township, which made it difficult for anyone who lived in the eastern part to win.  Soon afterward, he was appointed a justice of the peace which he held until his death.

Legacy
In 1956, a public school in Scarborough was named after him.

References

"William Tredway 1833-1909" in Fact Folk Lore (Scarborough)

External links
William Tredway Jr. P.S.

1833 births
1909 deaths
Ontario municipal councillors
People from Scarborough, Toronto